Inna Botyanovskaya (born 11 February 1984) is a Belarusian former footballer who played as a goalkeeper. She has been a member of the Belarus women's national team.

References

1984 births
Living people
Women's association football goalkeepers
Belarusian women's footballers
Belarus women's international footballers
FC Minsk (women) players
Bobruichanka Bobruisk players
Universitet Vitebsk players